John Vladimir Cruz Manalo (born September 6, 1995), popularly known by his stage name John Manalo, is a Filipino actor who is formerly a member of ABS-CBN's circle of homegrown talents named Star Magic. He is a multi-awarded child actor. He is the nephew of Jericho Rosales.

Career
Manalo starred in My First Lessons with Jollibee in which he co-stars with Nash Aguas, Sharlene San Pedro and Nikki Bagaporo.

In 2004, Manalo had his film debut Feng Shui as he played the role of Kris Aquino's son Denton. This film gave him 2 awards as 21st PMPC Awards for Movies – Best Child Performer and 2005 FAMAS Awards – Best Child Actor. And for the series of Mga Anghel na Walang Langit, Manalo got his 2 awards in The Guillermo Mendoza Memorial Foundation as Most Popular Child Actor and Best Child Performer. At a young age of 9, he became a multi-awarded child actor.

Manalo lives in Parang, Marikina with his parents (Rey and Lot), older sister ( Che) and two older brothers (Ryan and Nyep). He graduated high school at Marist School in Marikina. He took up A.B. Communication Arts in the University of Santo Tomas.

Filmography

Television

Film

Awards and nominations

References

External links

1995 births
Filipino male child actors
ABS-CBN personalities
GMA Network personalities
Star Magic
Living people
People from Marikina
Male actors from Metro Manila
University of Santo Tomas alumni